Clay Crupper (born 1935) was an American politician in the state of Kentucky. He served in the Kentucky House of Representatives from 1974 to 1992. He is a Democrat.

References

1935 births
Living people
Democratic Party members of the Kentucky House of Representatives
People from Owen County, Kentucky